The Life and Death of Jack Straw is a late 16th-century play, possibly written by playwright George Peele.

The play tells the story of Jack Straw, a rebel leader in the Peasants' Revolt of 1381. The play was possibly written by George Peele and probably originally designed for production in one of London's guild pageants. The play portrays Jack Straw as a tragic figure, being led into wrongful rebellion by the priest John Ball, drawing clear allegorical links between the instability of late-Elizabethan England and the politics of the 14th century. It is one of the earliest political plays of its type in England.

The play was initially printed in 1593 by John Danter for William Barley, and the rights were subsequently transferred to Thomas Pavier, who printed a new edition in 1604. There is no record of performance from the early modern period contained in either edition.

Performances in the modern era are rare. The only recorded performance was mounted by Bad Quarto Productions in November 2016 in New York City. A full cast audio adaptation was produced in 2019 by Beyond Shakespeare, with a stage revival planned for 2020, but, like most of 2020, then postponed. Recent authorship studies hint at Samuel Rowley and William Shakespeare whose reference texts have the lowest delta values, i.e. they show the smallest stylistic difference from The Life and Death of Jack Straw.

References

Bibliography
 .
 .
 . Facsimile of 1593/1604 version at Google Books
 .
 .
 .

External links 

 Text at Project Gutenberg
 
 Full-cast audio adaptation at Beyond Shakespeare

1590s plays
Plays set in England